The Spratly Islands dispute is an ongoing territorial dispute between China, the Philippines, Taiwan, Malaysia, Vietnam, and Brunei, concerning "ownership" of the Spratly Islands, a group of islands and associated "maritime features" (reefs, banks, and cays etc.) located in the South China Sea. The dispute is characterized by diplomatic stalemate and the employment of military pressure techniques (such as military occupation of disputed territory) in the advancement of national territorial claims. All except Brunei occupy some of the maritime features.

Most of the "maritime features" in this area have at least six names: The "International name", usually in English; the "Chinese name", sometimes different for PRC and ROC (and also in different character-sets); the Philippine, Vietnamese and Malaysian names, and also, there are alternate names (e.g. Spratly Island is also known as Storm Island), and sometimes names with European origins (French, Portuguese, Spanish, British, etc.).

In Philippine territory, the Spratly Islands are important for economic and strategic reasons. The Spratly area holds potentially significant, but largely unexplored, reserves of oil and natural gas, it is a productive area for world fishing, it is one of the busiest areas of commercial shipping traffic, and surrounding countries would get an extended continental shelf if their claims were recognized. In addition to economic incentives, the Spratlys sit astride major maritime trade routes to Northeast Asia, giving them added significance as positions from which to monitor maritime activity in the South China Sea and to potentially base and project military force from. In 2014, China drew increased international attention due to its dredging activities within the Spratlys, amidst speculation it is planning to further develop its military presence in the area. In 2015 satellite imagery revealed that China was rapidly constructing an airfield on Fiery Cross Reef within the Spratlys whilst continuing its land reclamation activities at other sites. The Philippines claims part of the area as its territory under UNCLOS, an agreement parts of which have been ratified by the countries involved in the Spratly islands dispute. However, China (PRC), Taiwan (ROC), and Vietnam are the only ones to have made claims based on historical sovereignty of the islands.

Reasons for the dispute
There are multiple reasons why the neighboring nations in particular, and the rest of the world in general, would be interested in the Spratly Islands.

Hydrocarbons
In 1968, oil was discovered in the region. The Geology and Mineral Resources Ministry of the People's Republic of China (PRC) has estimated that the Spratly area holds oil and natural gas reserves of 17.7 billion tons (1.60 × 1010 kg), compared to the 13 billion tons (1.17 × 1010 kg) held by Kuwait, placing it as, potentially, the fourth largest reserve bed in the world. The United States Energy Information Administration contests this, estimating almost no oil and less than 100 billion cubic feet of natural gas exists in fields near the Spratly Islands. Still, these large potential reserves have assisted in intensifying the territorial claims of the neighbouring countries.

In 1968 and 1970, the Philippines started to take their territorial claims more seriously and stationed troops on three islands which had been claimed by the adventurer Tomas Cloma as part of Freedomland. In 1973, Vietnamese troops were stationed on five islands.

On 11 March 1976, the first major Philippine oil discovery occurred off the coast of Palawan, near the Spratly Islands territory. In 2010, these oil fields supplied 15% of all petroleum consumed in the Philippines. In 1992, the PRC and Vietnam granted oil exploration contracts to US oil companies that covered overlapping areas in the Spratlys. In May 1992, the China National Offshore Oil Corporation (CNOOC) and Crestone Energy (a US company based in Denver, Colorado) signed a co-operation contract for the joint exploration of the Wan'an Bei-21 block, a  section of the southwestern South China Sea that includes Spratly Island areas. Part of the Crestone's contract covered Vietnam's blocks 133 and 134, where PetroVietnam, PetroStar Energy (US) and ConocoPhillips Vietnam Exploration & Production, a unit of ConocoPhillips, agreed to evaluate prospects in April 1992. This led to a confrontation between China and Vietnam, with each demanding that the other cancel its contract.

Commercial fishing
The region is one of the world's most productive areas for commercial fishing. In 2010, the Western Central Pacific (excluding the northernmost reaches of the South China Sea closest to the PRC coast) accounted for 14% of the total world catch at 11.7 million tonnes. This was up from less than 4 million tonnes in 1970. The PRC has predicted that the South China Sea holds combined fishing and oil and gas resources worth one trillion dollars. There have already been numerous clashes between the PRC and the Philippines, PRC and Vietnam, and between other nations over "foreign" fishing vessels in exclusive economic zones (EEZs), and the media regularly report the arrest of Chinese fishermen. In 1984, Brunei established an exclusive fishing zone encompassing Louisa Reef in the southeastern Spratly Islands.

Commercial shipping
The region is one of the busiest shipping lanes in the world. During the 1980s, at least 270 ships passed through the Spratly Islands region each day. More than half of the world's supertanker traffic, by tonnage, passes through the region's waters every year. Tanker traffic through the South China Sea is over three times greater than through the Suez Canal and five times more than through the Panama Canal; 25% of the world's crude oil passes through the South China Sea.

Confrontations
There have been a number of notable clashes in the Spratly Islands, some of which are discussed in the following articles:

 Territorial disputes in the South China Sea
 Southwest Cay Invasion (1975)
 East Sea Campaign (April 1975)
 Johnson South Reef Skirmish (14 March 1988)
 Scarborough Shoal standoff (commenced on 8 April 2012)
 Hai Yang Shi You 981 standoff (2014)

International law

Extended continental shelf claims, 2009
Via UNCLOS, the United Nations provided for countries with coastlines to submit claims to the UN's Commission on the Limits of the Continental Shelf (CLCS) for their continental shelf to be extended beyond 200 nautical miles of their shores. By 13 May 2009, a total of 48 nations made full claims, and dozens more made preliminary submissions. Two of the submissions made to the CLCS addressed claims in the South China Sea (SCS) – one by Vietnam for a claim over the northern portion of the SCS (which included the Paracel Islands), and another jointly by Vietnam and Malaysia for a joint claim over a "defined area" in the middle of the SCS between the two countries, which included part of the Spratly Islands. Brunei made a preliminary submission notifying of its intention to claim a continental shelf beyond 200 nautical miles from its shores.

China (PRC) immediately issued protests over the two submissions and called on the United Nations not to consider them. It also issued a stern warning to countries not to claim the islands which it said were its sovereign territory.

Philippine protests to ITLOS, 2011
On 23 May 2011, Former Philippine President Benigno Aquino III warned the visiting Chinese Defense Minister Liang Guanglie of a possible arms race in the region if tensions worsened over disputes in the South China Sea. In March, the Philippines complained that Chinese patrol boats had harassed a Philippine oil exploration vessel in disputed waters near the Spratlys, and subsequently filed a formal protest at the International Tribunal for the Law of the Sea (ITLOS).

Philippines submission to the Permanent Court of Arbitration, 2013–2016

On 22 January 2013, the Republic of the Philippines instituted arbitral proceedings against the China (PRC) in the Permanent Court of Arbitration (PCA). On 19 February 2013, China rejected and returned the Philippines' Notification. The Permanent Court of Arbitration acts as Registry in this arbitration.

Philippine Justice Antonio T. Carpio states that the case is solely a maritime dispute, and not territorial in nature. The Philippines seeks clarification from the tribunal as to whether China's nine-dash line can negate the Philippines' Exclusive Economic Zone as guaranteed under the United Nations Convention on the Law of the Sea (UNCLOS), of which China is a signatory. As part of the case, the Philippines also seeks clarification on whether rocks barely (1.8-meter) above water at high tide, (such as Scarborough Shoal), generate a  EEZ, or only a  territorial sea. Clarification of whether China can appropriate low-tide elevations, such as the Mischief Reef and the Subi Reef within the Philippines' EEZ, have also been included in the case. "The Philippines is not asking the tribunal to delimit by nautical measurements overlapping EEZs between China and the Philippines. The Philippines is also not asking the tribunal what country has sovereignty over an island, or rock above water at high tide, in the West Philippine Sea."

According to a PCA press release on 12 July 2016 "[The] Tribunal concluded that, as between the Philippines and China, there was no legal basis for China to claim historic rights to resources, in excess of the rights provided for by the Convention, within the sea areas falling within the ‘nine-dash line’".

Diplomatic moves

1992 ASEAN Declaration on the South China Sea
On 22 July 1992, ASEAN issued a declaration on the South China Sea, emphasising that the dispute should be solved peacefully without resorting to violence.

1995 Agreement
Following a 1995 dispute between the PRC and the Philippines, an ASEAN-brokered agreement was reached between the PRC and ASEAN member nations whereby one country would inform the other of any military movement within the disputed territory, and that there would be no further construction.

The agreement was promptly violated by PRC and Malaysia: claiming storm damage, seven PLA Navy vessels entered the area to repair "fishing shelters" in Panganiban Reef (Mischief Reef); Malaysia erected a structure on Investigator Shoal and landed at Rizal Reef (Commodore Reef). In response, the Philippines lodged formal protests, demanded the removal of the structures, increased naval patrols in Kalayaan, and issued invitations to American politicians to inspect the PRC bases by plane.

Declaration on the Conduct of Parties in the South China Sea, 2002
On 4 November 2002 in Phnom Penh, the Declaration on the Conduct of Parties in the South China Sea was signed by the 10 foreign ministers of ASEAN countries and China (PRC).  The parties explicitly undertook in this declaration, "to resolve their territorial and jurisdictional disputes by peaceful means, without resorting to the threat or use of force, through friendly consultations and negotiations by sovereign states directly concerned". The parties also undertook to exercise self-restraint with activities that would complicate or escalate disputes and affect peace and stability, including refraining from inhabiting the presently uninhabited islands, reefs, shoals, cays, and other features.  The parties pledged to carry out confidence building measures, such as: holding dialogues and exchange of views as appropriate between their defence and military officials; ensuring just and humane treatment of all persons who are in danger or distress; notifying on a voluntary basis other parties concerned of any impending joint / combined military exercise; and exchanging, on a voluntary basis, relevant information.  The parties may also explore or undertake cooperative activities such as: marine environmental protection; marine scientific research; safety of navigation and communication at sea; search and rescue operations; and combating transnational crime, including but not limited to trafficking in illicit drugs, piracy, armed robbery at sea, and illegal traffic in arms.

The declaration eases tensions, but falls short of a legally binding code of conduct.

Code of Conduct in the South China Sea
In July 2012, China (PRC) announced that it is open to launching discussions on the Code of Conduct in the South China Sea, but called for all parties to exercise self-restraint in keeping with the spirit of previous declarations and United Nation conventions. This announcement has been criticised by many neighbouring states because of the contradictions seen in the Scarborough Shoal at that time where China has established de facto control.

On 2 August 2012, the United States Senate unanimously passed a resolution declaring that China's July 2012 actions to unilaterally assert control of disputed territories in the South China Sea "are contrary to agreed upon principles with regard to resolving disputes and impede a peaceful resolution."

Chinese dredging activities

In 2014 Janes reported that during 2013–2014 China had begun a substantial program of dredging and land reclamation at three sites in the Spratlys. Janes concluded that 'The strategic effect of China's dredging and land reclamation makes it the most significant change to the South China Sea dispute since the 1988 Johnson South Reef Skirmish. If completed as envisioned in the CGI designs, China will have its first airstrip in the Spratly islands – and a base from which to impose its interpretation of the surrounding features' sovereignty'.

Janes also noted that in contrast to the previous construction projections of other countries in the Spratlys, 'The main difference between these activities and China's is that they modified existing land masses, while Beijing is constructing islands out of reefs that for the most part were under water at high tide'.

There is no known official term for the projects; the phrase "Great Wall of Sand" was first used by Harry Harris, commander of the US Pacific Fleet, in March 2015.

2015 construction of an airfield at Fiery Cross Reef
In April 2015 new satellite imagery revealed that China was rapidly constructing an airfield at Fiery Cross Reef, in addition to its ongoing dredging activities in the Spratlys. In September, China had completed a 3125-metre runway.

Claims and their basis

Brunei
Brunei claims the part of the South China Sea nearest to it as part of its continental shelf and exclusive economic zone (EEZ). In 1984, Brunei declared an EEZ encompassing the above-water islets it claims in Louisa Reef. Brunei does not practice military control in the area.

Basis of Brunei's claim
Brunei's claims to the reef are based on the United Nations Convention on the Law of the Sea (UNCLOS). Brunei states that the southern part of the Spratly Islands chain is actually a part of its continental shelf, and therefore a part of its territory and resources.

Malaysia
Malaysia claims a small number of islands in the Spratly Islands and its claims cover only the islands included in its exclusive economic zone of 200 miles as defined by the United Nations Convention on the Law of the Sea. Malaysia has militarily occupied five islands that it considers to be within its continental shelf. Swallow Reef (Layang Layang / Terumbu Layang / Pulau Layang Layang) was under control in 1983 and has been turned into an island through a land reclamation which now also hosts a dive resort. The Malaysian military also occupies Ardasier Reef (Terumbu Ubi), and Mariveles Reef (Terumbu Mantanani).

Basis of Malaysia's claim
Malaysia's claims are based upon the continental shelf principle, and have clearly defined coordinates within the limits of its EEZ defined in 1979. This argument requires that the islands were res nullius and this requirement is said to be satisfied as when Japan renounced their sovereignty over the islands according to the San Francisco Treaty, there was a relinquishment of the right to the islands without any special beneficiary. Therefore, the islands became res nullius and available for annexation.

The Philippines

The Republic of the Philippines claims the Spratly islands and are based on sovereignty over the Spratly Islands on the issues of res nullius and geography.

Basis for the Philippine claim
The Philippines contend their claim was res nullius as there was no effective sovereignty over the islands until the 1930s when France and then Japan acquired the islands. When Japan renounced their sovereignty over the islands according to the San Francisco Treaty, there was a relinquishment of the right to the islands without any special beneficiary. Therefore, the islands became res nullius and available for annexation, according to the claim.

In 1956, a private Filipino citizen, Tomás Cloma, unilaterally declared a state on 53 features in the South China Sea, calling it "Freedomland". In December 1974, Cloma was arrested and forced to sign a document to convey to the Philippines whatever rights he might have had in the territory for one peso. Cloma sold his claim to the Philippine government, which annexed (de jure) the islands in 1978, calling them Kalayaan.
On 11 June 1978, President Ferdinand Marcos of the Philippines issued Presidential decree No. 1596, declaring the Spratly Islands (referred to therein as the Kalayaan Island Group) as Philippine territory.

The Philippine claim to Kalayaan on a geographical basis can be summarised using the assertion that Kalayaan is distinct from other island groups in the South China Sea, because of the size of the biggest island in the Kalayaan group. A second argument used by the Philippines regarding their geographical claim over the Spratlys is that all the islands claimed by the Philippines lie within its 200-mile exclusive economic zone according to the 1982 United Nations Convention on the Law of the Sea. This argument assumes that the islands were res nullius. The Republic of the Philippines also contend, under maritime law that the People's Republic of China can not extend its baseline claims to the Spratlys because the PRC is not an archipelagic state.

The People's Republic of China (China) and the Republic of China (Taiwan) 

The People's Republic of China (PRC) claims are based on history and not UNCLOS. However, the PRC still claims all of the Spratly Islands as part of China. The PRC is a party to the UNCLOS, signing the agreement on 29 July 1994.

The Republic of China (ROC), which ruled Mainland China before 1949 and has been confined to Taiwan since 1949, also claims all of the Spratly Islands.

Basis for the PRC's and the ROC's claims
Chinese fishermen have fished around the islands since 200 BC. China claims to have discovered the islands in the Han dynasty in 2BC. The islands were claimed to have been marked on maps compiled during the time of Eastern Han dynasty and Eastern Wu (one of the Three Kingdoms). Since the Yuan dynasty in the 12th century, several islands that may be the Spratlys have been labelled as Chinese territory according to the Yuanshi, an official history commissioned by the Hongwu Emperor of the Ming dynasty in 1369, which has been subject to criticism for its lack of quality and numerous errors. This labeling has also occurred in the Qing dynasty from the 13th to 19th century; the islands may have appeared on a 1755 map, among others. Archaeological surveys have found the remains of Chinese pottery and coins in the islands, cited as proof for the PRC claim, but they are more likely to have come from shipwrecks of passing Chinese junks.

In the 19th century, Europeans found that Chinese fishermen from Hainan annually sojourned on the Spratly Islands for part of the year, while in 1877 it was the British who launched the first modern legal claims to the Spratlys.

When the Spratlys and Paracels were being surveyed by Germany in 1883, China issued protests against them. China sent naval forces on inspection tours in 1902 and 1907 and placed flags and markers on the islands. The Qing dynasty's successor state, the Republic of China, claimed the Spratly and Paracel islands under the jurisdiction of Hainan.

The Spratlys and the Paracels were conquered from France by Japan in 1939. Japan administered the Spratlys via Taiwan's jurisdiction and the Paracels via Hainan's jurisdiction. The Paracels and Spratlys were handed over to Republic of China control from Japan after the 1945 surrender of Japan, since the Allied powers assigned the Republic of China to receive Japanese surrenders in that area.

After World War II ended, the Republic of China was the "most active claimant". The Republic of China then garrisoned Itu Aba (Taiping) Island in 1946 and posted Chinese flags and markers on it along with Woody island in the Paracels, France tried, but failed to make them leave Woody island. The aim of the Republic of China was to block the French claims. The Republic of China drew up the map showing the U shaped claim on the entire South China Sea, showing the Spratly and Paracels in Chinese territory, in 1947.

Taiwan's garrison from 1946 to 1950 and 1956–present on Itu Aba represents an "effective occupation" of the Spratly Islands.

Taiwan garrison forces actively fended off Philippine efforts to build on the Spratly before 1971. After the UN vote to recognize the PRC, the ROC government in Taiwan no longer was in position to defend its rights. The Philippines and Vietnam took this opportunity to establish outposts in the Spratlys.

Vietnam

On 25 July 1994, Vietnam ratified the UNCLOS. Upon ratification it declared: 

Vietnam's response to China's claim is that Chinese records on Qianli Changsha and Wanli Shitang are records about non-Chinese territories. For example, Qianli Changsha and Wanli Shitang were referred to in the ancient Chinese texts Ling Wai Dai Da and Zhu Fan Zhi as being in the Sea of Jiaozhi, Jiaozhi being the old name for a Chinese province in modern-day northern Vietnam, or as writings on foreign countries.

Vietnam's view is that the Chinese records do not constitute the declaration and exercise of sovereignty and that China did not declare sovereignty over the Spratlys until after World War II.

On the other hand, Vietnam claims the Spratlys based on international law on declaring and exercising sovereignty.

Vietnam claims that it has occupied the Spratly and the Paracel islands at least since the 17th century, when they were not under the sovereignty of any state, and that they exercised sovereignty over the two archipelagos continuously and peacefully until they were invaded by Chinese armed forces. In Phủ biên tạp lục (撫邊雜錄, Miscellaneous Records of Pacification in the Border Area) by the scholar Lê Quý Đôn, Hoàng Sa (Paracel Islands), and Trường Sa (Spratly Islands) were defined as belonging to Quảng Ngãi District. In Đại Nam nhất thống toàn đồ (大南ー統全圖), an atlas of Vietnam completed in 1838, Trường Sa was shown as Vietnamese territory. Vietnam had conducted many geographical and resource surveys of the islands. The results of these surveys have been recorded in Vietnamese literature and history published since the 17th century. After the treaty signed with the Nguyễn dynasty, France represented Vietnam in international affairs and exercised sovereignty over the islands.

The Cairo Declaration, drafted by the Allies and China towards the end of World War II, listed the territories that the Allies intended to strip from Japan and return to China. Despite China being among the authors of the declaration, this list did not include the Spratlys. Vietnam's response to China's claim that the Cairo Declaration somehow recognised the latter's sovereignty over the Spratlys is that it has no basis in fact.

At the San Francisco Conference on the peace treaty with Japan, the Soviet Union proposed that the Paracels and Spratlys be recognised as belonging to China. This proposal was rejected by an overwhelming majority of the delegates. On 7 July 1951, Tran Van Huu, head of the Bảo Đại Government's (State of Vietnam) delegation to the conference declared that the Paracels and Spratlys were part of Vietnamese territory. This declaration met with no challenge from the 51 representatives at the conference.

The text of the Treaty of San Francisco did not list the Spratlys, or any other island territories, to be returned to China.

The Geneva Accords, which China was a signatory, settled the First Indochina War end. French Indochina was split into three countries: Laos, Cambodia and Vietnam. Vietnam was to be temporarily divided along the 17th Parallel.
Chapter I, Article 4 states:

On 26 October 1955, the Republic of Vietnam "South Vietnam" replaced the State of Vietnam (part of the French Union) and inherit of its rights. The Vietnamese government's Vietnam United Youth League, which runs the newspaper Thanh Niên News, claims that although, nothing was said explicitly about offshore archipelagos, which was of small interest by that times, it was clearly understood by all the parties that the Republic of Vietnam inherit of all the French Indochina's Vietnamese territories under the 17th Parallel. As the Paracel and the Spratly archipelagos (which lay below the 17th parallel) were part of the French Indochina since 1933, they were part of "South Vietnam" territory. The French bestowed its titles, rights, and claims over the two island chains to the Republic of Vietnam.

The Republic of Vietnam (RVN) exercised sovereignty over the islands, by placing border markers on the Spratlys to indicate South Vietnamese sovereignty over the archipelago. Up to the end of the Vietnam War the Republic of Vietnam Navy held military control over the majority of the Spratly Islands until 1975, when North Vietnamese troops attacked South Vietnamese troops and occupied the islands. After the Vietnam War, the unified Vietnam SRV (Socialist Republic of Vietnam) continued to claim the Spratly islands as an indisputably integral part of Vietnam.

China has produced a letter written by North Vietnam's former Prime Minister Phạm Văn Đồng in 1958 as proof that it holds sovereignty over the Paracel and Spratly islands. The Vietnamese newspaper Thanh Niên News claims China has intentionally misrepresented the letter, which contains no direct reference to either island chain. In addition, they claim that China is ignoring the spirit and time in which the letter was written. During that time, the two communist neighbors shared extremely close ties and the US navy was patrolling the Taiwan Strait, threatening them both. The letter, according to the newspaper, represented a diplomatic gesture of goodwill that has no legal relevance to the current territorial dispute.

On 4 September 1958, with the seventh fleet of the US Navy patrolling the Taiwan Strait, China announced its decision to extend the breadth of its territorial waters to 12 nautical miles. The United Nations (to which China was not yet a member) had just held its first Conference on the Law of the Sea in Switzerland in 1956, and the resulting treaties, including the Convention on the Territorial Sea and the Contiguous Zone, were signed in 1958. Though the UN conference was considered a success, it left the exact breadth of each nation's territorial waters somewhat unresolved; the US, for instance, said it should extend just three nautical miles.

On 14 September 1958, North Vietnam's PM Phạm Văn Đồng wrote his letter to PM Zhou Enlai in response to China's declaration. The Vietnamese newspaper Thanh Nien News claims that the letter has no legal relevance in China's sovereignty claims to the Paracel and Spratly archipelagos for the three following reasons:
 Point 1:  The Democratic Republic of Vietnam (North Vietnam) was not in control of the Paracel and the Spratly archipelagos at the time PM Dong wrote his letter.
 Point 2: The Constitutions of 1946 and 1957 of the Democratic Republic of Vietnam stipulated that territorial transfers must be decided by an act of parliament, the most powerful body in the country. As such, the Prime Minister had no right to relinquish the islands.
 Point 3: PM Pham Van Dong's letter is a unilateral declaration written solely as a response to China's declaration on a 12 nautical mile territorial waters. The letter makes no mention, whatsoever, of territorial sovereignty over any archipelago.

The islands occupied by Vietnam are organised as a district of Khánh Hòa Province. According to the 2009 census, the Trường Sa District has a population of 195 people. At the 12th National Assembly (2007–2011) Election held early in Trường Sa, the people and soldiers also voted for their local district government for the first time. For the first time, Trường Sa is organised like a normal inland district, with a township (Trường Sa) and two communes (Sinh Tồn and Song Tử Tây). Forty nine people were elected to the communes' people's councils. In July 2012 the National Assembly of Vietnam passed a law demarcating Vietnamese sea borders to include the Spratly and Paracel Islands.

Champa historically had a large presence in the South China Sea. The Vietnamese broke Champa's power in an invasion of Champa in 1471, and then finally conquered the last remnants of the Cham people in a war in 1832. The Vietnamese government fears that using the evidence of Champa's historical connection to the disputed islands in the South China Sea would expose the human rights violations and killings of ethnic minorities in Vietnam such as in the 2001 and 2004 uprisings, and lead to the issue of Cham autonomy being brought to attention.

Tabular listing of features showing country possessions

Timeline

History of the Spratly Islands

In the 19th century, Europeans found that Chinese fishermen from Hainan annually sojourned on the Spratly islands for part of the year, while in 1877 it was the British who launched the first modern legal claims to the Spratlys.

When the Spratlys and Paracels were being surveyed by Germany in 1883, China issued protests against them. China sent naval forces on inspection tours in 1902 and 1907 and placed flags and markers on the islands. The Qing dynasty's successor state, the Republic of China, claimed the Spratly and Paracel islands under the jurisdiction of Hainan.

Between April 7, 1933 and April 13, 1933, France took possession of the Spratly Islands and notification of the occupation appeared in the Official Journal of July 26, 1933, subsequently the islands was annexed to the Cochin-Chinese province of Baria on December 21, 1933 by the Cochin-China Governor J. Krautheimer.

The Spratlys and the Paracels were conquered by Japan in 1939. Japan administered the Spratlys via Taiwan's jurisdiction and the Paracels via Hainan's jurisdiction. France and UK protested and reasserted French soveregnty.

In 1946, the Americans reminded the Philippines at its independence that the Spratlys was not Philippine territory, both to not anger Chiang Kai-shek in China and because the Spratlys were not part of the Philippines per the 1898 treaty Spain signed with America.

The Paracels and Spratlys were handed over to Republic of China control from Japan after the 1945 surrender of Japan, since the Allied powers assigned the Republic of China to receive Japanese surrenders in that area.

The Republic of China garrisoned Itu Aba (Taiping) island in 1946 and posted Chinese flags and markers on it along with Woody island in the Paracels, France tried, but failed to make them leave Woody island. The aim of the Republic of China was to block the French claims.

In 1947, the Republic of China drew up the map showing the U shaped claim on the entire South China Sea, showing the Spratly and Paracels in Chinese territory. In 1947, the ROC government renamed 159 islands in the area and published the Map of the South China Sea Islands. The ROC has occupied Taiping Island, the largest island in the Spratlys, constantly since 1956.

The Republic of China (ROC), which ruled Mainland China before 1949, has been confined to Taiwan since 1949.

After pulling out its garrison in 1950 when the Republic of China evacuated to Taiwan, when the Filipino Tomas Cloma uprooted an ROC flag on Itu Aba laid claim to the Spratlys and, the Republic of China (now Taiwan) again regarrisoned Itu Aba in 1956.

Taiwan's garrison from 1946 to 1950 and 1956-now on Itu Aba represents an "effective occupation" of the Spratlys. China established a coastal defence system against Japanese pirates or smugglers.

North Vietnam recognised China's claims on the Paracels and Spratlys during the Vietnam War as it was being supported by China. Only after winning the war and conquering South Vietnam did North Vietnam retract its recognition and admitted it recognised them as part of China to receive aid from China in fighting the Americans.

The Philippines claimed the Spratlys in 1971 under President Marcos, after Taiwanese troops attacked and shot at a Philippine fishing boat on Itu Aba.

Under President Lee Teng-hui, Taiwan stated that "legally, historically, geographically, or in reality", all of the South China Sea and Spratly islands were Taiwan's territory and under Taiwanese sovereignty, and denounced actions undertaken there by Malaysia and the Philippines, in a statement on 13 July 1999 released by the foreign ministry of Taiwan. Taiwan and China's claims "mirror" each other; during international talks involving the Spratly islands, China and Taiwan have cooperated with each other since both have the same claims.

Taiwan and China are largely strategically aligned on the Spratly islands issue, since they both claim exactly the same area, so Taiwan's control of Itu Aba (Taiping) island is viewed as an extension of China's claim. Taiwan and China both claim the entire island chain, while all the other claimants only claim portions of them. China has proposed co-operation with Taiwan against all the other countries claiming the islands. Taiwanese lawmakers have demanded that Taiwan fortify Itu Aba (Taiping) island with weapons to defend against the Vietnamese, and both China and Taiwanese NGOs have pressured Taiwan to expand Taiwan's military capabilities on the island, which played a role in Taiwan expanding the island's runway in 2012. China has urged Taiwan to co-operate and offered Taiwan a share in oil and gas resources while shutting out all the other rival claimants. Taiwanese lawmakers have complained about repeated Vietnamese aggression and trespassing on Taiwan's Itu Aba (Taiping), and Taiwan has started viewing Vietnam as an enemy over the Spratly Islands, not China. Taiwan's state run oil company CPC Corp's board director Chiu Yi has called Vietnam as the "greatest threat" to Taiwan. Taiwan's airstrip on Taiping has irritated Vietnam. China views Taiwan's expansion of its military and airstrip on Taiping as benefiting China's position against the other rival claimants from southeast Asian countries.

Malaysia has militarily occupied three islands that it considers to be within its continental shelf. Swallow Reef (Layang Layang / Terumbu Layang / Pulau Layang Layang) was under control in 1983 and has been turned into an island through a land reclamation which now also hosts a dive resort. The Malaysian military also occupies Ardasier Reef (Terumbu Ubi), and Mariveles Reef (Terumbu Mantanani).

Since 1992, Malaysia and Vietnam have agreed to jointly develop areas around these disputed islands. Malaysia has said that it is monitoring all of the actions made by countries involved in the dispute.

Taiwan performed live fire military exercises on Taiping island in September 2012; reports said that Vietnam was explicitly named by the Taiwanese military as the "imaginary enemy" in the drill.  Vietnam protested against the exercises as violation of its territory and "voiced anger", demanding that Taiwan stop the drill. Among the inspectors of the live fire drill were Taiwanese national legislators, adding to the tensions.

In 2010, it was reported that the former Malaysian Prime Minister Mahathir Mohamad believed Malaysia could profit from China's economic growth through co-operation with China, and said that China "was not a threat to anyone and was not worried about aggression from China", as well accusing the United States of provoking China and trying to turn China's neighbours against China. Malaysian authorities displayed no concern over China conducting a military exercise at James Shoal in March 2013, However, until present Malaysia still maintained a balance relations with the countries involved in this dispute. But since China has start encroaching its territorial waters, Malaysia has become active in condemning China.

In January 2013, the Philippines formally initiated arbitration proceedings against China's claim on the territories within the "nine-dash line" that includes Spratly Islands, which it said is "unlawful" under the United Nations Convention on the Law of the Sea (UNCLOS). An arbitration tribunal was constituted under Annex VII of UNCLOS and it was decided in July 2013 that the Permanent Court of Arbitration (PCA) would function as registry and provide administrative duties in the proceedings.

On 12 July 2016, the arbitrators of the tribunal of PCA agreed unanimously with the Philippines. They concluded in the award that there was no evidence that China had historically exercised exclusive control over the waters or resources, hence there was "no legal basis for China to claim historic rights" over the nine-dash line. Accordingly, the PCA tribunal decision is ruled as final and non-appealable by either countries. The tribunal also criticized China's land reclamation projects and its construction of artificial islands in the Spratly Islands, saying that it had caused "severe harm to the coral reef environment". It also characterized Taiping Island and other features of the Spratly Islands as "rocks" under UNCLOS, and therefore are not entitled to a 200 nautical mile exclusive economic zone. China however rejected the ruling, calling it "ill-founded". Taiwan, which currently administers Taiping Island, the largest of the Spratly Islands, also rejected the ruling.

See also
 Chinese unification
 Great Wall of Sand
 Kuril Islands dispute
 Liancourt Rocks dispute
 Sansha
 Senkaku Islands dispute
 Territories claimed by the Philippines

References

Further reading

 
 
 
 
 François-Xavier Bonnet, Geopolitics of Scarborough Shoal,  Irasec's Discussion Papers, No. 14, November 2012.
 
 
 Forbes, Andrew, and Henley, David: Vietnam Past and Present: The North (Sino-Viet relations in Paracels and Spratlys). Chiang Mai. Cognoscenti Books, 2012. .
 Menon, Rajan, "Worry about Asia, Not Europe", The National Interest, Sept–Oct 2012 Issue, 11 September 2012

External links
 Spratlys website (pro-China)
 Paracels and Spratlys website (pro-Vietnam)
 Mariner's page of the Spratly Islands
 Taiwanese List with ~170 entries
   (archived from on 2013-06-16)
 List of atolls with areas
 A tabular summary about the Spratly and Paracel Islands
 Third Party Summary of the Dispute
 
 A collection of documents on Spratly and Paracel Islands by Nguyen Thai Hoc Foundation
 Inventory of Conflict and Environment (ICE), Spratly Islands Dispute
 Red Sky and Yellow Stars over Asia, an analysis by The CenSEI Report
 

Disputed territories in Southeast Asia
Territorial disputes of Brunei
Territorial disputes of China
Territorial disputes of Malaysia
Territorial disputes of the Philippines
Territorial disputes of the Republic of China
Territorial disputes of Vietnam